Johan Henri Gustaaf Cohen, known as Johan Cohen Gosschalk (3 November 1873, Amsterdam - 18 May 1912, Amsterdam) was a Dutch jurist, graphic artist and painter of Jewish ancestry. His sister, also became a well known painter.

Biography
His father, Salomon, was a dealer in dairy products. He originally studied law. Between 1897 and 1900, he took private painting lessons from Jan Veth in Bussum. In 1902, he received permission, by Royal decree, to add his mother's maiden name to his own. Most of his works were portraits or landscapes.

In 1901, he married Johanna Bonger, the widow of Theo van Gogh, who had died in 1891. They built a villa, named "Eikenhof", in Bussum, but lived there only a short time before moving to Amsterdam. In 1905, he helped to organize an exhibition of the works of Vincent van Gogh at the Stedelijk Museum, and wrote the introduction for the catalogue. After that, he continued his efforts to make Van Gogh's work more widely known.

Always in poor health, his condition worsened after 1910 and he spent much of his time bedridden or in a sanatorium. When he died, Johanna held a retrospective exhibition of his work. Later, she resumed calling herself Van Gogh-Bonger. In 1913, his mother, Christina, established a fund for the ""; to be awarded to promising students at the Rijksakademie.

References

External links

 Biography @ Vereniging Vrieden

1873 births
1912 deaths
Dutch painters
Dutch portrait painters
Jewish painters
Painters from Amsterdam